Symon Sadik (born 30 August 1985) is a Bangladeshi film actor, assistant director, lyricist, model and politician. His films are predominantly in Dhallywood cinema. He is the current Assistant General Secretary of the Bangladesh Film Artists' Association. He made his debut as a lead in the Bangladeshi film Ji Hujur (2012). And he won Bioscope Borsho-sera awards for Best acting in Poramon (2013). He also won Bangladesh National Film Award for Best Actor for his role in the film Jannat (2018).

Film career
2012

Sadik started in 2012 with director Zakir Hossain Raju in Ji Hujur movie opposite Sara Zerin.

2013

he was introduced to the audience by starring in the movie Poramon directed by Zakir Hossain Raju opposite Mahiya Mahi. He also acted in the Bangladeshi film Er Beshi Valobasha Jay Na directed by Zakir Hossain Raju with Nijhum Robina.

2014

Sadik starred inTui Sudhu Amar directed by Raju Chowdhury opposite with Moumita Mou.  He also acted in  Tomar Kache Rhini directed by Shahadat Hossain Liton and opposite Toma Mirza. And Swapno Chowa directed by Shafiq Hasan with Bobby.

2015

He starred in Mostafizur Rahman Manik's Itish Petish Prem but the name was changed to Chupi Chupi Prem (2015 film) due to censor board objections and opposite with Priyonti. He also acted in Iftakar Chowdhury's Action Jasmine in (2015) with Bobby, and in Shafi Uddin Shafi's film Black Money opposite Moushumi Hamid and Keya.

2016

Sadik starred in P A Kajol's Chokher Dekha with Ahona Rahman.  He also acted in 16 Ana Prem in (2016) directed by Ali Azad and opposite with Taniya, and in Saimon Tarique's Matir Pori along Sadia Islam Lamia.  His next film was Apurba Rana's Pure Jay Mon with PoriMoni and A J Rana's film Ojante Valobasha opposite Alisha Pradhan and Sadik also lyrics this film's title song "Ojante Bhalobasha"

2018

He acted opposite Mahiya Mahi in the film Jannat in (2018) directed by Mostafizur Rahman Manik. He was awarded the Bangladesh National Film Award for Best Actor in the category for his outstanding performance in the film.  He also acted in Matal (2018) directed by Shahin Suman and opposite Adhora Khan.

2022 
On 28 January 2022, Sadik became the Assistant General Secretary of the Bangladesh Film Artists' Association after bagging 212 votes. In March 2022, Sadik was made temporary General Secretary in the association after Zayed Khan's oath was declared illegal by the association's president.

Personal life 
Symon Sadik married Dipa Sadik in 2014 and they have two sons.

Filmography

Music video

Awards and nominations

Notes

References

External links 
 

Living people
People from Kishoreganj District
Bangladeshi male film actors
Best Actor National Film Award (Bangladesh) winners
1985 births